KDLS-FM (105.5 MHz) is a commercial FM radio station licensed to Perry, Iowa, and serving the Des Moines metropolitan area.  It airs a Regional Mexican music radio format, known as "La Ley 105.5 FM."  (La Ley translates to "The Law.")

KDLS-FM is licensed to the Latin Broadcasting Company.  The owners of the Latin Broadcasting Company, based in Taylor, Michigan, are Pres. Pedro Zamora of Brownstown, Michigan, and Vice Pres. Jorge O. Hernandez-Angulo of Morgan Hill, California.

The transmitter and broadcast tower are located on West Avenue in Granger, Iowa, halfway between Perry and Des Moines.

History
On February 26, 1971, KDLS-FM first signed on.  It was originally on 104.9 MHz.  It was owned by the Perry Broadcasting Company, which also owns former sister station AM 1310 KDLS.  Even though both stations continue to use the KDLS call sign, they are now separately owned.

In the 1990s, the station moved to 105.5 MHz.  The station broadcast a country music format with frequent farm reports.

In the 2010s, the station was sold to owners specializing in Latin music formats.  It switched to Regional Mexican music.

References

External links

DLS